Ifield can refer to:
 Frank Ifield, country music singer
 Ifield, West Sussex, England
 Singlewell or Ifield,  part of the town of Gravesend, Kent
 Intelligent Fields, also known as Integrated operations